Omphalepia is a genus of snout moths. It was described by George Hampson in 1906.

Species
 Omphalepia dujardini
 Omphalepia sobria Hampson, 1906

References

Epipaschiinae
Pyralidae genera